Minor league baseball teams were based in Lexington, North Carolina between 1937 and 1967. Lexington teams played as members of the Carolina League in 1936, North Carolina State League from 1937 to 1942 and 1945 to 1952, Tar Heel League in 1953 Western Carolina League from 1960 to 1961 and Western Carolinas League from 1963 to 1967. Lexington won two league championships.

Lexington teams played as a minor league affiliate of the Philadelphia A's (1938–1939, 1945–1952), New York Mets (1961), San Francisco Giants (1963–1966) and Atlanta Braves (1967).

History
Minor league baseball began in Lexington, North Carolina during the 1936 season under unique circumstances. The Rutherford County Owls began 1936 the season as charter members of the eight–team Independent level Carolina League, relocating to Lexington during the season. The Independent league was nicknamed as an "outlaw" league because of the Independent status. On July 3, 1936, the Rutherford County franchise was surrendered to the league after an attack of an umpire occurred at the Owls' home ballpark in Forest City, North Carolina. Rutherford County had a record of 21–25 under managers Maurice Frew and Baxter Moose when the franchise was surrendered. The franchise became the Lexington Indians and immediately replaced Rutherford County in league play. After compiling a 16–36 record in Lexington, the team then finished the season in 6th place with a 37–61 overall record.

According to reports of the July 3, 1936 incident, umpire C.T. Skidmore was attacked outside of Alexander Park after a game against Shelby. After the attack, Skidmore was complimentary of the players and team officials, who assisted him after the attack, including Dr. C.H. Verner who was president of the Rutherford County club and treated Skidmore's injuries. Skidmore stated he believed the attack was by out of town fans or gamblers. After the incident, Verner surrendered the team to the league. After a Carolina League meeting on July 5, 1936, the franchise was awarded to Lexington.

In 1937, the Lexington Indians continued play in a new league. The Indians began play as members of the reformed Class D level North Carolina State League. The North Carolina League reformed in 1937, with Lexington playing joining the Cooleemee Weavers, Landis Sens, Mooresville Moors, Newton-Conover Twins, Thomasville Chair Makers, Salisbury Bees and Shelby Cardinals in the eight–team league. Lexington became an affiliate of the Philadelphia A's in 1938 and 1939.

After being defeated in the playoffs in 1938 and 1939, the Lexington Indians captured the 1940 North Carolina State League Championship. After finishing with a 64–38 record and placing 3rd in the regular season, Lexington defeated the 1st place Kannapolis Towelers 3 games to 0 in the semi–finals. In the Finals, Lexington defeated the Mooresville Moors 4 games to 1 to claim the Championship.

After the North Carolina State League had a hiatus due to World War II in 1943 and 1944, the Lexington A's began play as the league reformed in 1945. Taking their moniker, Lexington also resumed as an Philadelphia A's affiliate in 1945, a relationship which lasted to 1952.The Lexington A's advanced to the North Carolina State League finals in 1945, 1947 and 1949, losing each time.

Lexington resumed using the Lexington Indians moniker in 1951. In 1953, the North Carolina State League and Western Carolina League merged, creating the ten–team Tar Heel League. The Lexington Indians finished with a 59–54 record, placing 4th in the regular season. In the playoffs, Lexington defeated the Forest City Owls 4 games to 2. In the Tar Heel League finals, the Lexington Indians defeated the Marion Marauders 4 games to 2, to win the 1953 Tar Heel League Championship. However, Lexington was one of six league teams that did not return to play in 1954.

In 1960, the Lexington Indians began play as founding members in the reformed Class D level Western Carolina League. The Indians were an affiliate of the New York Mets in 1961. Lexington finished 70–29 to finish with the league pennant in 1960, before losing in the playoffs. In 1961, the Indians advanced to the league finals before losing. The Lexington Indians folded after the 1961 season.

After not fielding a team in 1962, the Lexington Giants returned to the renamed Class A level Western Carolinas League in 1963, as an affiliate of the San Francisco Giants. The Giants would not reach the playoffs in their four seasons of play.

The Lexington Braves continued play in the Western Carolinas League in 1967, becoming an affiliate of the Atlanta Braves. The Braves finished with a record of 55–67, missing the playoffs. The franchise folded after the 1967 season.

Lexington, North Carolina has not hosted another minor league team.

The ballparks
Lexington minor teams played at Wennonah Field in 1937. For the remainder of their duration, Lexington teams were noted to have played at Holt-Moffit Field. The ballpark was called Wennonah Field in 1937 when a WPA Project was completed in time for the 1938 season. Holt-Moffit Field is still in use today, located at 101 South State Street, Lexington, North Carolina.

Timeline

Year–by–year records

Notable alumni

Chris Arnold (1966)
Cliff Bolton (1952)
Bobby Bonds (1965) 3x MLB All–Star; San Francisco Giants Wall of Fame
Dick Bosman (1964) 1969 AL ERA title
Mike Corkins (1965)
Cesar Gutierrez (1963–1965)
Bob Hooper (1942)
Buck Jordan (1942)
Max Lanier (1963–1965, MGR) 2x MLB All–Star
Les McCrabb (1937)
Ray Miller (1964)
Jose Morales (1964)

See also
Lexington Giants playersLexington Indians playersLexington A's players

References

External Links
Baseball Reference

Davidson County, North Carolina